The men's qualification for the 1972 Summer Olympics.

Qualified teams
A total of 16 teams participated in the finals of the Olympic tournament.

Automatically qualified
 (as hosts)
 (as holders)
Europe (UEFA)

Africa (CAF)

Asia (AFC)

North and Central America (CONCACAF)

South America (CONMEBOL)

Qualifications

UEFA (Europe)

The European Qualifiers for the 1972 Summer Olympics tournament took place after two rounds between 1 May 1971 and 21 May 1972. Denmark, East Germany, Poland and Soviet Union gained qualification to the Olympic tournament and West Germany as qualified automatically as hosts, Hungary as holders.

CONMEBOL (South America)

The South American Pre-Olympic tournament was held over a total of two rounds from 26 November to 11 December 1971 in Colombia and saw Brazil and Colombia qualify.

CONCACAF (North, Central America and Caribbean)

The CONCACAF qualifying rounds and Pre-Olympic tournament was held from 23 May 1971 to 28 May 1972, and saw Mexico and United States qualify.

CAF (Africa)

The African Qualifiers tournament for the 1972 Summer Olympics took place over a total of two rounds between 7 March 1971 and 28 May 1972. Ghana, Morocco and Sudan gained qualification to the Olympic tournament.

AFC (Asia)

The Pre-Olympic tournaments of the Asian Qualifiers for the 1972 Summer Olympic were held from 23 September 1971 to 3 May 1972. Burma, Iran and Malaysia qualify.

References

 
qualification